Michael Shawn Bernardo (28 July 1969 – 14 February 2012) was a South African kickboxer and boxer from Cape Town. Bernardo was known as Beru-chan in Japan, where he has taken part in K-1 World GPs since 1994. He holds notable wins over Mirko Cro Cop, Andy Hug, Francisco Filho, Branko Cikatic, Stan Longinidis, Gary Goodridge and three consecutive wins over K-1 legend Peter Aerts.

Biography 
Mike Bernardo was of Italian and English heritage and was born in Fishhoek near Cape Town on 28 July 1969. His surname was actually Barnardo, but most people knew him as Bernardo. When he was younger, bullies often picked on him and beat him up. Bernardo started with Kyokushin to deal with his bullies: "I started Karate when I was, 12, 13 years old. The reason why I started was, because as a youngster I was quite tall but not strong. A lot of children at school were in gangs and they would always pick on me and beat me up because I was a big guy so they could prove their friends they were stronger. I took up martial arts lessons and went back to school and when they started to pick on me again and try to beat me up, I beat them all up."

Being a keen all-round sportsman, Mike Bernardo tried to do as many sports as he could. Besides karate, he started surfing when he was six, played numerous other sports but the one that he liked to play the most was rugby. After he kept getting sent off for fighting, Bernardo knew he had to make the transition from rugby to fighting sports.

Kickboxing career
It was under the guidance of former boxing champion Steve Kalakoda where Mike Bernardo received his kickboxing training. He met Kalakoda during his compulsory military service where the latter worked as a physical training instructor in the navy. Bernardo quickly established a fearsome reputation as a heavy-hitting knockout fighter. After fights in South Africa, Italy and Russia Bernardo got invited through one of England's promoters to fight in K-1. He made his debut in the K-1 World Grand Prix 1995 against Andy Hug. Bernardo pulled off the shocking win via third round stoppage.

One of his biggest successes came early in his career. In 1996, just one year into his K-1 run, Mike Bernardo competed in the K-1 World Grand Prix for the second time. Bernardo faced a tough task as he would meet Peter Aerts in the first round of the tournament. Just as he did against Hug one year before, Bernardo scored a big upset with a huge right cross that knocked the former K-1 World Grand Prix champion out. Bernardo made it to the finals that year, ultimately losing to Andy Hug in a great fight. Bernardo's other major success took place in 2000 when he won the K-1 World Grand Prix in Fukuoka, beating Jörgen Kruth, Andrew Thompson and then Mirko Cro Cop in the final. He won all three fights that night by KO.

Though he never did win the K-1 World Grand Prix crown, Bernardo proved he could hang with the very best fighters. In his career he faced all of the K-1's best - including Jerome Le Banner, Andy Hug, Peter Aerts, Ernesto Hoost and Francisco Filho - and at some point in their career, nearly all of them found themselves on the receiving end of a KO. On New Year's Eve of 2004, Bernardo was going to face Nigerian fighter Bobby Ologun in "K1-Dynamite!", but couldn't take part in the event due to a neck injury and retired from K-1.

Boxing career
In addition to his K-1 career, Mike Bernardo made his professional boxing debut on 28 February 1993, against Delius Musemwa. Mike was able to knock out Delius in the third round. In the second bout he lost by TKO for the first round against little lighter opponent Anton Nel on 7 April 1993. After a string of victories he won the vacant WBF title against Dan Jerling by defeating the Czechoslovakian fighter in the sixth round by KO. The bout took place in May 2000. In 2001, on 8 June, Mike Bernardo defended his WBF title against Peter McNeeley in Cape Town and knocked McNeely out in just 41 seconds. In May 2002, due to being inactive for long, Bernardo was stripped of the belt. Most of bouts (8) were held in South Africa, twice he fight in USA, once in Hungary, Mexico and Japan.

Marriage

Mike Bernardo was married to singer Beshara Ornellas. They were married on 5 April 1999 and the marriage lasted a brief 10 months when Beshara left on 14 February 2000.

Religion
Mike Bernardo was a deeply religious man. His belief in God played an important role in his fighting career and life: "Before the fight I say a prayer that God keep us both safe. And his will be done. In my heart there's no vengeance, I don't wanna inflict pain just because I want to inflict pain, but because I want to compete against the person that I am competing with. We're both competitors in the same line of work and we're just putting our skills together to see who's better than the other one on the day. My message is that there is hope for all of us, there's hope for every single one. Jesus is the saviour, and he's the way to offer hope, love, and also hope in healing as well. And with him with us we can achieve anything we want to achieve. That is my message."

Death
Bernardo died on February 14, 2012, at the age of 42. According to News24, the cause of death was unknown.

Titles and accomplishments 
Professional Kickboxing
World Olympic Kickboxing Super Heavyweight winner
2004 World Kickboxing Association Muay Thai Super Heavyweight World champion
1998 W.A.K.O. Pro Muay Thai Super Heavyweight World champion
1996 World Kickboxing Association Muay Thai Super Heavyweight World champion
K-1
2001 K-1 World Grand Prix in Nagoya 3rd place
2000 K-1 World Grand Prix in Fukuoka winner
1998 K-1 World Grand Prix 3rd place
1996 K-1 World Grand Prix runner up
1995 K-1 World Grand Prix 3rd place
Professional boxing
W.B.F. World Heavyweight champion

Kickboxing record

|-
|-  bgcolor="#c5d2ea"
| 2004-11-06 || Draw ||align=left| Kaoklai Kaennorsing || Titans 1st || Kitakyushu, Japan || Draw || 3 || 3:00
|-
|-  bgcolor="#CCFFCC"
| 2004-09-18 || Win ||align=left| Petar Majstorovic || K-1 W.K.A. Championships || Basel, Switzerland || Decision || 5 || 3:00
|-
! style=background:white colspan=9 |
|-
|-  bgcolor="#FFBBBB"
| 2004-06-26 || Loss ||align=left| Tatsufumi Tomihira || K-1 Beast 2004 in Shizuoka Quarter Finals || Shizuoka, Japan || KO || 1 || 1:09
|-
|-  bgcolor="#FFBBBB"
| 2004-03-27 || Loss ||align=left| Jan Nortje || K-1 World Grand Prix 2004 in Saitama || Saitama, Japan || TKO (Punch Rush/3 Knockdowns) || 1 || 2:32
|-
|-  bgcolor="#CCFFCC"
| 2003-10-31 || Win ||align=left| Sergei Gur || K-1 Final Fight Stars War in Zagreb || Zagreb, Croatia || TKO (Referee Stoppage) || 2 || N/A
|-
|-  bgcolor="#FFBBBB"
| 2003-10-11 || Loss ||align=left| Alexey Ignashov || K-1 World Grand Prix 2003 Final Elimination || Osaka, Japan || KO (Right Punch and Right Low Kick) || 2 || 2:21
|-
! style=background:white colspan=9 |
|-
|-  bgcolor="#CCFFCC"
| 2003-04-06 || Win ||align=left| Eric Esch || K-1 Survival 2003 Japan Grand Prix Final || Yokohama, Japan || KO (Right Head Kick) || 2 || 1:10
|-
|-  bgcolor="#c5d2ea"
| 2003-07-13 || Draw ||align=left| Francisco Filho || K-1 World Grand Prix 2003 in Fukuoka || Fukuoka, Japan || Draw || 5 || 3:00
|-
|-  bgcolor="#CCFFCC"
| 2003-04-06 || Win ||align=left| Tsuyoshi Nakasako || K-1 Beast 2003 || Yamagata, Japan || TKO || 2 || 1:02
|-
|-  bgcolor="#CCFFCC"
| 2002-12-31 || Win ||align=left| Gary Goodridge || Inoki Bom-Ba-Ye 2002 || Saitama, Japan || KO (Right Hook) || 1 || 2:12
|-
|-  bgcolor="#FFBBBB"
| 2002-10-05 || Loss ||align=left| Mark Hunt || K-1 World Grand Prix 2002 Final Elimination || Saitama, Japan || Ext.R Decision (Unanimous) || 4 || 3:00
|-
! style=background:white colspan=9 |
|-
|-  bgcolor="#CCFFCC"
| 2002-09-22 || Win ||align=left| Tom Erikson || K-1 Andy Spirits Japan GP 2002 Final || Osaka, Japan || KO (Right Hook) || 1 || 2:30
|-
|-  bgcolor="#FFBBBB"
| 2002-08-17 || Loss ||align=left| Gary Goodridge || K-1 World Grand Prix 2002 in Las Vegas || Las Vegas, Nevada, USA || KO (Punches) || 1 || 1:38
|-
! style=background:white colspan=9 |
|-
|-  bgcolor="#FFBBBB"
| 2002-03-03 || Loss ||align=left| Ray Sefo || K-1 World Grand Prix 2002 in Nagoya || Nagoya, Japan || Decision (Unanimous) || 5 || 3:00
|-
|-  bgcolor="#CCFFCC"
| 2001-12-08 || Win ||align=left| Adam Watt || K-1 World Grand Prix 2001 Final || Tokyo, Japan || Decision (Unanimous) || 3 || 3:00
|-
|-  bgcolor="#FFBBBB"
| 2001-10-08 || Loss ||align=left| Adam Watt || K-1 World Grand Prix 2001 in Fukuoka Quarter Finals || Fukuoka, Japan || TKO (Right Punch/2 Knockdowns) || 1 || 2:27
|-
|-  bgcolor="#CCFFCC"
| 2001-07-20 || Win ||align=left| Lloyd van Dams || K-1 World Grand Prix 2001 in Nagoya Semi Finals || Nagoya, Japan || Ext.R Decision (Majority) || 4 || 3:00
|-
! style=background:white colspan=9 |
|-
|-  bgcolor="#CCFFCC"
| 2001-07-20 || Win ||align=left| Takeru || K-1 World Grand Prix 2001 in Nagoya Quarter Finals || Nagoya, Japan || TKO (Corner Stoppage) || 2 || 1:40
|-
|-  bgcolor="#c5d2ea"
| 2001-03-17 || NC ||align=left| Jérôme Le Banner || K-1 Gladiators 2001 || Yokohama, Japan || NC || 1 || 3:00
|-
|-  bgcolor="#CCFFCC"
| 2001-01-30 || Win ||align=left| Hiromi Amada || K-1 Rising 2001 || Matsuyama, Japan || TKO (Corner Stoppage) || 4 || 1:32
|-
|-  bgcolor="#CCFFCC"
| 2000-10-09 || Win ||align=left| Mirko Cro Cop || K-1 World Grand Prix 2000 in Fukuoka Final || Fukuoka, Japan || TKO (Corner Stoppage) || 1 || 1:07
|-
! style=background:white colspan=9 |
|-
|-  bgcolor="#CCFFCC"
| 2000-10-09 || Win ||align=left| Andrew Thomson || K-1 World Grand Prix 2000 in Fukuoka Semi Finals || Fukuoka, Japan || TKO (Doctor Stoppage) || 1 || 0:34
|-
|-  bgcolor="#CCFFCC"
| 2000-10-09 || Win ||align=left| Jörgen Kruth || K-1 World Grand Prix 2000 in Fukuoka Quarter Finals || Fukuoka, Japan || KO (Right Hook) || 1 || 2:24
|-
|-  bgcolor="#CCFFCC"
| 2000-09-03 || Win ||align=left| Sergio Espedito || K-1 Africa Grand Prix 2000 || Cape Town, South Africa || KO (Straight Right Punch) || 1 || N/A
|-
|-  bgcolor="#FFBBBB"
| 1999-10-03 || Loss ||align=left| Mirko Cro Cop || K-1 World Grand Prix '99 Opening Round || Osaka, Japan || TKO (3 Knockdowns) || 1 || 1:20
|-
! style=background:white colspan=9 |
|-
|-  bgcolor="#CCFFCC"
| 1999-08-22 || Win ||align=left| Rony Sefo || K-1 Spirits '99 || Tokyo, Japan || KO (Left Hook) || 4 || 1:24
|-
|-  bgcolor="#FFBBBB"
| 1999-06-20 || Loss ||align=left| Sam Greco || K-1 Braves '99 || Fukuoka, Japan || Decision (Unanimous) || 5 || 3:00
|-
! style=background:white colspan=9 |
|-
|-  bgcolor="#CCFFCC"
| 1999-04-25 || Win ||align=left| Masaaki Satake || K-1 Revenge '99 || Yokohama, Japan || Decision (Unanimous) || 5 || 3:00
|-
|-  bgcolor="#FFBBBB"
| 1998-12-13 || Loss ||align=left| Peter Aerts || K-1 Grand Prix '98 Final Round Semi Finals || Tokyo, Japan || TKO (Referee Stoppage/2 Knockdowns) || 1 || 2:53
|-
|-  bgcolor="#CCFFCC"
| 1998-12-13 || Win ||align=left| Francisco Filho || K-1 Grand Prix '98 Final Round Quarter Finals || Tokyo, Japan || KO (Right Overhand) || 3 || 1:35
|-
|-  bgcolor="#CCFFCC"
| 1998-10-28 || Win ||align=left| Sadau Kiatsongrit || K-1 Japan '98 Kamikaze || Tokyo, Japan || TKO (Corner Stoppage) || 2 || 2:00
|-
|-  bgcolor="#CCFFCC"
| 1998-09-27 || Win ||align=left| Maurice Smith || K-1 World Grand Prix '98 Opening Round || Osaka, Japan || Decision (Unanimous) || 5 || 3:00
|-
! style=background:white colspan=9 |
|-
|-  bgcolor="#CCFFCC"
| 1998-08-28 || Win ||align=left| Andrew Thomson || K-1 Japan Grand Prix '98 || Tokyo, Japan || TKO (Referee Stoppage/Right Straight) || 1 || 3:03
|-
|-  bgcolor="#CCFFCC"
| 1998-04-09 || Win ||align=left| Glaube Feitosa || K-1 Dream '98 || Nagoya, Japan || TKO (3 Knockdowns) || 1 || 1:42
|-
|-  bgcolor="#CCFFCC"
| 1998-04-09 || Win ||align=left| Gordon Minors || K-1 Kings '98 || Yokohama, Japan || KO (Punch) || 2 || 2:05
|-
! style=background:white colspan=9 |
|-
|-  bgcolor="#FFBBBB"
| 1997-11-09 || Loss ||align=left| Peter Aerts || K-1 Grand Prix '97 Final Quarter Finals || Tokyo, Japan || TKO (High Kick and Straight to the Body) || 3 || 1:17
|-
|-  bgcolor="#CCFFCC"
| 1997-09-07 || Win ||align=left| Branko Cikatić || K-1 Grand Prix '97 1st Round || Osaka, Japan || TKO (Doctor Stoppage) || 1 || 0:38
|-
! style=background:white colspan=9 |
|-
|-  bgcolor="#CCFFCC"
| 1997-07 || Win ||align=left| Mike Vieira || || Cape Town, South Africa || KO (Right High Kick) || 3 || 1:33
|-
|-  bgcolor="#FFBBBB"
| 1997-06-07 || Loss ||align=left| Andy Hug || K-1 Fight Night '97 || Zurich, Switzerland || Decision (Unanimous) || 5 || 3:00
|-
! style=background:white colspan=9 |
|-
|-  bgcolor="#FFBBBB"
| 1997-04-29 || Loss ||align=left| Ernesto Hoost || K-1 Braves '97 || Fukuoka, Japan || TKO (Referee Stoppage/Right Hook) || 4 || 1:03
|-
|-  bgcolor="#CCFFCC"
| 1997-03-16 || Win ||align=left| Masaaki Satake || K-1 Kings '97 || Yokohama, Japan || KO (Right Uppercut) || 2 || 1:24
|-
|-  bgcolor="#c5d2ea"
| 1996-12-08 || Draw ||align=left| Stan Longinidis || K-1 Hercules '96 || Nagoya, Japan || Draw || 5 || 3:00
|-
|-  bgcolor="#CCFFCC"
| 1996-10-18 || Win ||align=left| Peter Aerts || K-1 Star Wars '96 || Yokohama, Japan || KO (Right Hook) || 3 || 2:37
|-
|-  bgcolor="#CCFFCC"
| 1996-09-01 || Win ||align=left| Peter Aerts || K-1 Revenge '96 || Osaka, Japan || DQ (Groin Kick) || 1 || 1:21
|-
|-  bgcolor="#FFBBBB"
| 1996-05-06 || Loss ||align=left| Andy Hug || K-1 Grand Prix '96 Final || Yokohama, Japan || KO (Left Spinning Low Kick) || 2 || 1:18
|-
! style=background:white colspan=9 |
|-
|-  bgcolor="#CCFFCC"
| 1996-05-06 || Win ||align=left| Musashi || K-1 Grand Prix '96 Semi Finals || Yokohama, Japan || Decision (Unanimous) || 3 || 3:00
|-
|-  bgcolor="#CCFFCC"
| 1996-05-06 || Win ||align=left| Peter Aerts || K-1 Grand Prix '96 Quarter Finals || Yokohama, Japan || KO (Left Hook) || 3 || 0:13
|-
|-  bgcolor="#CCFFCC"
| 1996-03-10 || Win ||align=left| Jeff Roufus || K-1 Grand Prix '96 Opening Battle || Yokohama, Japan || TKO || 2 || 1:37
|-
! style=background:white colspan=9 |
|-
|-  bgcolor="#FFBBBB"
| 1995-12-09 || Loss ||align=left| Peter Aerts || K-1 Hercules || Nagoya, Japan || KO (Right Hook) || 1 || 0:40
|-
|-  bgcolor="#CCFFCC"
| 1995-09-03 || Win ||align=left| Andy Hug || K-1 Revenge II || Yokohama, Japan || KO (Punch) || 2 || 2:43
|-
|-  bgcolor="#FFBBBB"
| 1995-05-04 || Loss ||align=left| Jérôme Le Banner || K-1 Grand Prix '95 Semi Finals || Tokyo, Japan || KO (Right Low Kick) || 2 || 3:05
|-
|-  bgcolor="#CCFFCC"
| 1995-05-04 || Win ||align=left| Stan Longinidis || K-1 Grand Prix '95 Quarter Finals || Tokyo, Japan || KO (Right High Kick) || 3 || 1:42
|-
|-  bgcolor="#CCFFCC"
| 1995-03-03 || Win ||align=left| Andy Hug || K-1 Grand Prix '95 Opening Battle || Tokyo, Japan || TKO (Corner Stoppage) || 3 || 2:39
|-
! style=background:white colspan=9 |
|-  bgcolor="#FFBBBB"
| 1994-00-00 || Loss ||align=left| Jérôme Le Banner || I.S.K.A. Intercontinental Championship || Cape Town, South Africa || Decision (Unanimous) || 10 || 2:00
|-
! style=background:white colspan=9|
|-

|-
|-  bgcolor="#CCFFCC"
| 2001-06-08 || Win ||align=left| Peter McNeeley || K-1 World Grand Prix 2001 Preliminary South Africa || Cape Town, South Africa || TKO || 1 || 0:41 || 11–1–1
|-
! style=background:white colspan=9 |
|-
|-  bgcolor="#c5d2ea"
| 2000-07-30 || Draw ||align=left| Justin Fortune || N/A || Nagoya, Japan || TD || 1 || N/A || 10–1–1
|-
|-  bgcolor="#CCFFCC"
| 2000-05-12 || Win ||align=left| Daniel Jerling || N/A || Szekszárd, Hungary || TKO || 6 || N/A || 10–1
|-
|-  bgcolor="#CCFFCC"
| 2000-01-21 || Win ||align=left| Scott Conner || N/A || Chicago, Illinois, USA || TKO || 2 || N/A || 9–1
|-
|-  bgcolor="#CCFFCC"
| 1996-03-31 || Win ||align=left| Juan Quintana || N/A || Portland, Maine, USA || PTS || 6 || N/A || 8–1
|-
|-  bgcolor="#CCFFCC"
| 1995-12-02 || Win ||align=left| Alberto Toribio Coman || N/A || Cape Town, South Africa || TKO || 4 || N/A || 7–1
|-
|-  bgcolor="#CCFFCC"
| 1995-09-10 || Win ||align=left| Hector Fernandez || N/A || Tijuana, Mexico || KO || 1 || N/A || 6–1
|-
|-  bgcolor="#CCFFCC"
| 1994-11-27 || Win ||align=left| Themba Msweli || N/A || Cape Town, South Africa || KO || 3 || N/A || 5–1
|-
|-  bgcolor="#CCFFCC"
| 1994-05-18 || Win ||align=left| Nzuzu Manyube || N/A || Cape Town, South Africa || TKO || 1 || N/A || 4–1
|-
|-  bgcolor="#CCFFCC"
| 1993-11-06 || Win ||align=left| Matthews Zulu || N/A || Sun City, South Africa || PTS || 4 || N/A || 3–1
|-
|-  bgcolor="#CCFFCC"
| 1993-07-25 || Win ||align=left| Graham Makazi || N/A || Cape Town, South Africa || KO || 1 || N/A || 2–1
|-
|-  bgcolor="#FFBBBB"
| 1993-04-06 || Loss ||align=left| Anton Nel || N/A || Temba, South Africa || TKO || 1 || N/A || 1–1
|-
|-  bgcolor="#CCFFCC"
| 1993-02-28 || Win ||align=left| Delias Musemwa || N/A || Cape Town, South Africa || KO || 3 || N/A || 1–0

|-
|-  bgcolor="#c5d2ea"
| 2001-12-31 || Draw ||align=left| Nobuhiko Takada || Inoki Bom-Ba-Ye 2001 || Saitama, Japan || Draw || 3 || 3:00 || 0–0–1
|-
|-
| colspan=9 | Legend:

See also 
List of K-1 events
List of K-1 champions
List of male kickboxers

References

External links 
Mike Bernardo Interview
K-1sport.de - Complete Fighters Profile of Mike Bernardo
Kakutougi: K-1 News and Interviews
Statistics at boxrec.com
Mike Bernardo MMA Stats, Pictures, News, Videos, Biography - Sherdog.com

1969 births
2012 suicides
Heavyweight boxers
South African male kickboxers
Heavyweight kickboxers
South African male mixed martial artists
Heavyweight mixed martial artists
Mixed martial artists utilizing boxing
Mixed martial artists utilizing Kyokushin kaikan
Sportspeople from Cape Town
South African people of Italian descent
South African people of English descent
White South African people
South African male boxers
South African male karateka
2012 deaths